Strangalidium is a genus of beetles in the family Cerambycidae, containing the following species:

 Strangalidium chemsaki Giesbert, 1997
 Strangalidium kunaium Giesbert, 1997
 Strangalidium linsleyanum (Giesbert, 1986)
 Strangalidium nigellum (Bates, 1872)

References

Lepturinae